Sama'i (also known as usul semai) is a vocal piece of Ottoman Turkish music composed in 6/8 meter. This form and meter (usul in Turkish) is often confused with the completely different Saz Semaisi, an instrumental form consisting of three to four sections, in 10/8 meter, or usul aksak semai (broken semai in Turkish). Semai is one of the most important forms in Ottoman Turkish Sufi music.

Sample songs

See also
Saz semai
Yürük semai
Waltz
Dede Efendi

References
 The Music of the Ottoman Court - Walter Feldman
 Sufism, Music and Society - Swedish Research Institute
 Makam - Karl Signell
 Meaning in Turkish Musical Culture - Eugenia Popescu-Judetz

External links
many pieces of Ottoman sheet music
many of the most common usul

Turkish music
Musical forms
Classical and art music traditions